The 1922 South Dakota Coyotes football team was an American football team that represented the University of South Dakota in the North Central Conference (NCC) during the 1922 college football season. In its first season under head coach Stub Allison, the team compiled a 2–6–1 record (0–2–1 against NCC opponents), tied for last place in the NCC, and was outscored by a total of 161 to 54.

Schedule

References

South Dakota
South Dakota Coyotes football seasons
South Dakota Coyotes football